Calculus is the mathematical study of continuous change, in the same way that geometry is the study of shape, and algebra is the study of generalizations of arithmetic operations.

It has two major branches, differential calculus and integral calculus; the former concerns instantaneous rates of change, and the slopes of curves, while the latter concerns accumulation of quantities, and areas under or between curves. These two branches are related to each other by the fundamental theorem of calculus, and they make use of the fundamental notions of convergence of infinite sequences and infinite series to a well-defined limit.

Infinitesimal calculus was developed independently in the late 17th century by Isaac Newton and Gottfried Wilhelm Leibniz. Later work, including codifying the idea of limits, put these developments on a more solid conceptual footing. Today, calculus has widespread uses in science, engineering, and social science.

Etymology
In mathematics education, calculus denotes courses of elementary mathematical analysis, which are mainly devoted to the study of functions and limits. The word calculus is Latin for "small pebble" (the diminutive of calx, meaning "stone"), a meaning which still persists in medicine. Because such pebbles were used for counting out distances, tallying votes, and doing abacus arithmetic, the word came to mean a method of computation. In this sense, it was used in English at least as early as 1672, several years prior to the publications of Leibniz and Newton.

In addition to the differential calculus and integral calculus, the term is also used for naming specific methods of calculation and related theories which seek to model a particular concept in terms of mathematics. Examples of this convention include propositional calculus, Ricci calculus, calculus of variations, lambda calculus, and process calculus. Furthermore, the term "calculus" has variously been applied in ethics and philosophy, for such systems as Bentham's felicific calculus, and the ethical calculus.

History 

Modern calculus was developed in 17th-century Europe by Isaac Newton and Gottfried Wilhelm Leibniz (independently of each other, first publishing around the same time) but elements of it appeared in ancient Greece, then in China and the Middle East, and still later again in medieval Europe and in India.

Ancient precursors

Egypt 
Calculations of volume and area, one goal of integral calculus, can be found in the Egyptian Moscow papyrus ( BC), but the formulae are simple instructions, with no indication as to how they were obtained.

Greece 

Laying the foundations for integral calculus and foreshadowing the concept of the limit, ancient Greek mathematician Eudoxus of Cnidus ( – 337 BC) developed  the method of exhaustion to prove the formulas for cone and pyramid volumes.

During the Hellenistic period, this method was further developed by Archimedes ( – ), who combined it with a concept of the indivisibles—a precursor to infinitesimals—allowing him to solve several problems now treated by integral calculus. In The Method of Mechanical Theorems he describes. for example, calculating the center of gravity of a solid hemisphere, the center of gravity of a frustum of a circular paraboloid, and the area of a region bounded by a parabola and one of its secant lines.

China 
The method of exhaustion was later discovered independently in China by Liu Hui in the 3rd century AD in order to find the area of a circle. In the 5th century AD, Zu Gengzhi, son of Zu Chongzhi, established a method that would later be called Cavalieri's principle to find the volume of a sphere.

Medieval

Middle East

In the Middle East, Hasan Ibn al-Haytham, Latinized as Alhazen ( AD) derived a formula for the sum of fourth powers. He used the results to carry out what would now be called an integration of this function, where the formulae for the sums of integral squares and fourth powers allowed him to calculate the volume of a paraboloid.

India
In the 14th century, Indian mathematicians gave a non-rigorous method, resembling differentiation, applicable to some trigonometric functions. Madhava of Sangamagrama and the Kerala School of Astronomy and Mathematics thereby stated components of calculus. A complete theory encompassing these components is now well known in the Western world as the Taylor series or infinite series approximations. However, they were not able to "combine many differing ideas under the two unifying themes of the derivative and the integral, show the connection between the two, and turn calculus into the great problem-solving tool we have today".

Modern 
Johannes Kepler's work Stereometrica Doliorum formed the basis of integral calculus. Kepler developed a method to calculate the area of an ellipse by adding up the lengths of many radii drawn from a focus of the ellipse.

A significant work was a treatise, the origin being Kepler's methods, written by Bonaventura Cavalieri, who argued that volumes and areas should be computed as the sums of the volumes and areas of infinitesimally thin cross-sections. The ideas were similar to Archimedes' in The Method, but this treatise is believed to have been lost in the 13th century, and was only rediscovered in the early 20th century, and so would have been unknown to Cavalieri. Cavalieri's work was not well respected since his methods could lead to erroneous results, and the infinitesimal quantities he introduced were disreputable at first.

The formal study of calculus brought together Cavalieri's infinitesimals with the calculus of finite differences developed in Europe at around the same time. Pierre de Fermat, claiming that he borrowed from Diophantus, introduced the concept of adequality, which represented equality up to an infinitesimal error term. The combination was achieved by John Wallis, Isaac Barrow, and James Gregory, the latter two proving predecessors to the second fundamental theorem of calculus around 1670.

The product rule and chain rule, the notions of higher derivatives and Taylor series, and of analytic functions were used by Isaac Newton in an idiosyncratic notation which he applied to solve problems of mathematical physics. In his works, Newton rephrased his ideas to suit the mathematical idiom of the time, replacing calculations with infinitesimals by equivalent geometrical arguments which were considered beyond reproach. He used the methods of calculus to solve the problem of planetary motion, the shape of the surface of a rotating fluid, the oblateness of the earth, the motion of a weight sliding on a cycloid, and many other problems discussed in his Principia Mathematica (1687). In other work, he developed series expansions for functions, including fractional and irrational powers, and it was clear that he understood the principles of the Taylor series. He did not publish all these discoveries, and at this time infinitesimal methods were still considered disreputable.

These ideas were arranged into a true calculus of infinitesimals by Gottfried Wilhelm Leibniz, who was originally accused of plagiarism by Newton. He is now regarded as an independent inventor of and contributor to calculus. His contribution was to provide a clear set of rules for working with infinitesimal quantities, allowing the computation of second and higher derivatives, and providing the product rule and chain rule, in their differential and integral forms. Unlike Newton, Leibniz put painstaking effort into his choices of notation.

Today, Leibniz and Newton are usually both given credit for independently inventing and developing calculus. Newton was the first to apply calculus to general physics and Leibniz developed much of the notation used in calculus today. The basic insights that both Newton and Leibniz provided were the laws of differentiation and integration, emphasizing that differentiation and integration are inverse processes, second and higher derivatives, and the notion of an approximating polynomial series.

When Newton and Leibniz first published their results, there was great controversy over which mathematician (and therefore which country) deserved credit. Newton derived his results first (later to be published in his Method of Fluxions), but Leibniz published his "Nova Methodus pro Maximis et Minimis" first. Newton claimed Leibniz stole ideas from his unpublished notes, which Newton had shared with a few members of the Royal Society. This controversy divided English-speaking mathematicians from continental European mathematicians for many years, to the detriment of English mathematics. A careful examination of the papers of Leibniz and Newton shows that they arrived at their results independently, with Leibniz starting first with integration and Newton with differentiation. It is Leibniz, however, who gave the new discipline its name. Newton called his calculus "the science of fluxions", a term that endured in English schools into the 19th century. The first complete treatise on calculus to be written in English and use the Leibniz notation was not published until 1815.

Since the time of Leibniz and Newton, many mathematicians have contributed to the continuing development of calculus. One of the first and most complete works on both infinitesimal and integral calculus was written in 1748 by Maria Gaetana Agnesi.

Foundations 
In calculus, foundations refers to the rigorous development of the subject from axioms and definitions.  In early calculus the use of infinitesimal quantities was thought unrigorous, and was fiercely criticized by a number of authors, most notably Michel Rolle and Bishop Berkeley. Berkeley famously described infinitesimals as the ghosts of departed quantities in his book The Analyst in 1734.  Working out a rigorous foundation for calculus occupied mathematicians for much of the century following Newton and Leibniz, and is still to some extent an active area of research today.

Several mathematicians, including Maclaurin, tried to prove the soundness of using infinitesimals, but it would not be until 150 years later when, due to the work of Cauchy and Weierstrass, a way was finally found to avoid mere "notions" of infinitely small quantities. The foundations of differential and integral calculus had been laid. In Cauchy's Cours d'Analyse, we find a broad range of foundational approaches, including a definition of continuity in terms of infinitesimals, and a (somewhat imprecise) prototype of an (ε, δ)-definition of limit in the definition of differentiation. In his work Weierstrass formalized the concept of limit and eliminated infinitesimals (although his definition can actually validate nilsquare infinitesimals). Following the work of Weierstrass, it eventually became common to base calculus on limits instead of infinitesimal quantities, though the subject is still occasionally called "infinitesimal calculus". Bernhard Riemann used these ideas to give a precise definition of the integral. It was also during this period that the ideas of calculus were generalized to the complex plane with the development of complex analysis.

In modern mathematics, the foundations of calculus are included in the field of real analysis, which contains full definitions and proofs of the theorems of calculus.  The reach of calculus has also been greatly extended. Henri Lebesgue invented measure theory, based on earlier developments by Émile Borel, and used it to define integrals of all but the most pathological functions. Laurent Schwartz introduced distributions, which can be used to take the derivative of any function whatsoever.

Limits are not the only rigorous approach to the foundation of calculus. Another way is to use Abraham Robinson's non-standard analysis. Robinson's approach, developed in the 1960s, uses technical machinery from mathematical logic to augment the real number system with infinitesimal and infinite numbers, as in the original Newton-Leibniz conception. The resulting numbers are called hyperreal numbers, and they can be used to give a Leibniz-like development of the usual rules of calculus. There is also smooth infinitesimal analysis, which differs from non-standard analysis in that it mandates neglecting higher-power infinitesimals during derivations. Based on the ideas of F. W. Lawvere and employing the methods of category theory, smooth infinitesimal analysis views all functions as being continuous and incapable of being expressed in terms of discrete entities. One aspect of this formulation is that the law of excluded middle does not hold. The law of excluded middle is also rejected in constructive mathematics, a branch of mathematics that insists that proofs of the existence of a number, function, or other mathematical object should give a construction of the object. Reformulations of calculus in a constructive framework are generally part of the subject of constructive analysis.

Significance 
While many of the ideas of calculus had been developed earlier in Greece, China, India, Iraq, Persia, and Japan, the use of calculus began in Europe, during the 17th century, when Newton and Leibniz built on the work of earlier mathematicians to introduce its basic principles. The Hungarian polymath John von Neumann wrote of this work,

Applications of differential calculus include computations involving velocity and acceleration, the slope of a curve, and optimization. Applications of integral calculus include computations involving area, volume, arc length, center of mass, work, and pressure. More advanced applications include power series and Fourier series.

Calculus is also used to gain a more precise understanding of the nature of space, time, and motion. For centuries, mathematicians and philosophers wrestled with paradoxes involving division by zero or sums of infinitely many numbers. These questions arise in the study of motion and area. The ancient Greek philosopher Zeno of Elea gave several famous examples of such paradoxes. Calculus provides tools, especially the limit and the infinite series, that resolve the paradoxes.

Principles

Limits and infinitesimals 

Calculus is usually developed by working with very small quantities. Historically, the first method of doing so was by infinitesimals. These are objects which can be treated like real numbers but which are, in some sense, "infinitely small". For example, an infinitesimal number could be greater than 0, but less than any number in the sequence 1, 1/2, 1/3, ... and thus less than any positive real number. From this point of view, calculus is a collection of techniques for manipulating infinitesimals.

The infinitesimal approach fell out of favor in the 19th century because it was difficult to make the notion of an infinitesimal precise. In the late 19th century, infinitesimals were replaced within academia by the epsilon, delta approach to limits. Limits describe the behavior of a function at a certain input in terms of its values at nearby inputs. They capture small-scale behavior using the intrinsic structure of the real number system (as a metric space with the least-upper-bound property). In this treatment, calculus is a collection of techniques for manipulating certain limits. Infinitesimals get replaced by sequences of smaller and smaller numbers, and the infinitely small behavior of a function is found by taking the limiting behavior for these sequences. Limits were thought to provide a more rigorous foundation for calculus, and for this reason they became the standard approach during the 20th century. However, the infinitesimal concept was revived in the 20th century with the introduction of non-standard analysis and smooth infinitesimal analysis, which provided solid foundations for the manipulation of infinitesimals.

Differential calculus 

Differential calculus is the study of the definition, properties, and applications of the derivative of a function. The process of finding the derivative is called differentiation. Given a function and a point in the domain, the derivative at that point is a way of encoding the small-scale behavior of the function near that point. By finding the derivative of a function at every point in its domain, it is possible to produce a new function, called the derivative function or just the derivative of the original function. In formal terms, the derivative is a linear operator which takes a function as its input and produces a second function as its output. This is more abstract than many of the processes studied in elementary algebra, where functions usually input a number and output another number. For example, if the doubling function is given the input three, then it outputs six, and if the squaring function is given the input three, then it outputs nine. The derivative, however, can take the squaring function as an input. This means that the derivative takes all the information of the squaring function—such as that two is sent to four, three is sent to nine, four is sent to sixteen, and so on—and uses this information to produce another function. The function produced by differentiating the squaring function turns out to be the doubling function.

The "derivative" now takes the function , defined by the expression "", as an input, that is all the information—such as that two is sent to four, three is sent to nine, four is sent to sixteen, and so on—and uses this information to output another function, the function , as will turn out.

In Lagrange's notation, the symbol for a derivative is an apostrophe-like mark called a prime. For instance, if  is the squaring function, then  is its derivative (the doubling function  from above).

If the input of the function represents time, then the derivative represents change with respect to time.

This gives an exact value for the slope of a straight line. If the graph of the function is not a straight line, however, then the change in  divided by the change in  varies. Derivatives give an exact meaning to the notion of change in output with respect to change in input. The slope between these two points is

This expression is called a difference quotient.

The tangent line is a limit of secant lines just as the derivative is a limit of difference quotients. For this reason, the derivative is sometimes called the slope of the function .

Here is a particular example, the derivative of the squaring function at the input 3. Let  be the squaring function.

The slope of the tangent line to the squaring function at the point (3, 9) is 6, that is to say, it is going up six times as fast as it is going to the right. The limit process just described can be performed for any point in the domain of the squaring function. This defines the derivative function of the squaring function or just the derivative of the squaring function for short. A computation similar to the one above shows that the derivative of the squaring function is the doubling function.

Leibniz notation 

A common notation, introduced by Leibniz, for the derivative in the example above is

In an approach based on limits, the symbol  is to be interpreted not as the quotient of two numbers but as a shorthand for the limit computed above. For example:

Another example of correct notation could be:

Integral calculus 

Integral calculus is the study of the definitions, properties, and applications of two related concepts, the indefinite integral and the definite integral. The process of finding the value of an integral is called integration. (This use of lower- and upper-case letters for a function and its indefinite integral is common in calculus.) The definite integral inputs a function and outputs a number, which gives the algebraic sum of areas between the graph of the input and the x-axis. The technical definition of the definite integral involves the limit of a sum of areas of rectangles, called a Riemann sum.

A motivating example is the distance traveled in a given time. If the speed is constant, only multiplication is needed:

But if the speed changes, a more powerful method of finding the distance is necessary. One such method is to approximate the distance traveled by breaking up the time into many short intervals of time, then multiplying the time elapsed in each interval by one of the speeds in that interval, and then taking the sum (a Riemann sum) of the approximate distance traveled in each interval. The basic idea is that if only a short time elapses, then the speed will stay more or less the same. However, a Riemann sum only gives an approximation of the distance traveled. We must take the limit of all such Riemann sums to find the exact distance traveled.

When velocity is constant, the total distance traveled over the given time interval can be computed by multiplying velocity and time. For example, travelling a steady 50 mph for 3 hours results in a total distance of 150 miles. Plotting the velocity as a function of time yields a rectangle with height equal to the velocity and width equal to the time elapsed. Therefore, the product of velocity and time also calculates the rectangular area under the (constant) velocity curve. This connection between the area under a curve and distance traveled can be extended to any irregularly shaped region exhibiting a fluctuating velocity over a given time period.

For each small segment, we can choose one value of the function . Call that value . Then the area of the rectangle with base  and height  gives the distance (time  multiplied by speed ) traveled in that segment. Associated with each segment is the average value of the function above it, . The sum of all such rectangles gives an approximation of the area between the axis and the curve, which is an approximation of the total distance traveled. A smaller value for  will give more rectangles and in most cases a better approximation, but for an exact answer we need to take a limit as  approaches zero.

The definite integral is written as:

and is read "the integral from a to b of f-of-x with respect to x." The Leibniz notation  is intended to suggest dividing the area under the curve into an infinite number of rectangles, so that their width  becomes the infinitesimally small .

The indefinite integral, or antiderivative, is written:

Functions differing by only a constant have the same derivative, and it can be shown that the antiderivative of a given function is actually a family of functions differing only by a constant.

The unspecified constant  present in the indefinite integral or antiderivative is known as the constant of integration.

Fundamental theorem 

The fundamental theorem of calculus states that differentiation and integration are inverse operations. More precisely, it relates the values of antiderivatives to definite integrals. Because it is usually easier to compute an antiderivative than to apply the definition of a definite integral, the fundamental theorem of calculus provides a practical way of computing definite integrals. It can also be interpreted as a precise statement of the fact that differentiation is the inverse of integration.

Furthermore, for every  in the interval ,

This realization, made by both Newton and Leibniz, was key to the proliferation of analytic results after their work became known. (The extent to which Newton and Leibniz were influenced by immediate predecessors, and particularly what Leibniz may have learned from the work of Isaac Barrow, is difficult to determine because of the priority dispute between them.) The fundamental theorem provides an algebraic method of computing many definite integrals—without performing limit processes—by finding formulae for antiderivatives. It is also a prototype solution of a differential equation. Differential equations relate an unknown function to its derivatives, and are ubiquitous in the sciences.

Applications 

Calculus is used in every branch of the physical sciences, actuarial science, computer science, statistics, engineering, economics, business, medicine, demography, and in other fields wherever a problem can be mathematically modeled and an optimal solution is desired. It allows one to go from (non-constant) rates of change to the total change or vice versa, and many times in studying a problem we know one and are trying to find the other. Calculus can be used in conjunction with other mathematical disciplines. For example, it can be used with linear algebra to find the "best fit" linear approximation for a set of points in a domain. Or, it can be used in probability theory to determine the expectation value of a continuous random variable given a probability density function. In analytic geometry, the study of graphs of functions, calculus is used to find high points and low points (maxima and minima), slope, concavity and inflection points. Calculus is also used to find approximate solutions to equations; in practice it is the standard way to solve differential equations and do root finding in most applications. Examples are methods such as Newton's method, fixed point iteration, and linear approximation. For instance, spacecraft use a variation of the Euler method to approximate curved courses within zero gravity environments.

Physics makes particular use of calculus; all concepts in classical mechanics and electromagnetism are related through calculus. The mass of an object of known density, the moment of inertia of objects, and the potential energies due to gravitational and electromagnetic forces can all be found by the use of calculus. An example of the use of calculus in mechanics is Newton's second law of motion, which states that the derivative of an object's momentum with respect to time equals the net force upon it. Alternatively, Newton's second law can be expressed by saying that the net force is equal to the object's mass times its acceleration, which is the time derivative of velocity and thus the second time derivative of spatial position. Starting from knowing how an object is accelerating, we use calculus to derive its path.

Maxwell's theory of electromagnetism and Einstein's theory of general relativity are also expressed in the language of differential calculus. Chemistry also uses calculus in determining reaction rates and in studying radioactive decay. In biology, population dynamics starts with reproduction and death rates to model population changes.

Green's theorem, which gives the relationship between a line integral around a simple closed curve C and a double integral over the plane region D bounded by C, is applied in an instrument known as a planimeter, which is used to calculate the area of a flat surface on a drawing. For example, it can be used to calculate the amount of area taken up by an irregularly shaped flower bed or swimming pool when designing the layout of a piece of property.

In the realm of medicine, calculus can be used to find the optimal branching angle of a blood vessel so as to maximize flow. Calculus can be applied to understand how quickly a drug is eliminated from a body or how quickly a cancerous tumour grows.

In economics, calculus allows for the determination of maximal profit by providing a way to easily calculate both marginal cost and marginal revenue.

See also 

 Glossary of calculus
 List of calculus topics
 List of derivatives and integrals in alternative calculi
 List of differentiation identities
 Publications in calculus
 Table of integrals

Notes

References

Further reading

 
 
 
 
 
  Uses synthetic differential geometry and nilpotent infinitesimals.
 
 
 
 
 
 Keisler, H.J. (2000). Elementary Calculus: An Approach Using Infinitesimals. Retrieved 29 August 2010 from http://www.math.wisc.edu/~keisler/calc.html

External links 

 
 
 
 Calculus Made Easy (1914) by Silvanus P. Thompson Full text in PDF
 
 Calculus.org: The Calculus page at University of California, Davis – contains resources and links to other sites
 Earliest Known Uses of Some of the Words of Mathematics: Calculus & Analysis
 The Role of Calculus in College Mathematics from ERICDigests.org
 OpenCourseWare Calculus from the Massachusetts Institute of Technology
 Infinitesimal Calculus – an article on its historical development, in Encyclopedia of Mathematics, ed. Michiel Hazewinkel.
 
 Calculus training materials at imomath.com
  The Excursion of Calculus, 1772